The rue de la Victoire is a street in the 9th arrondissement of Paris.

The former name of the street was "rue Chantereine", which means "singing frogs", after the many frogs in the area as the quarter was swampy. The street took the name "rue de la Victoire" in 1797 after the success of Napoleon's campaign in Italy. In 1816, during the Bourbon Restoration, the street changed its name, but the name was restored in 1833.

Notable places

 Paris' Grande Synagogue is at Number 44.
 The former hôtel Beauharnais, from which Napoleon organized the coup of the 18 Brumaire lies on the street.
 The Hotel Thellusson lay between the Rue de Provence and the Rue de la Victoire until its destruction in 1826.
 At the junction with the Rue Joubert there is a townhouse designed by the architect François-Joseph Bélanger. After his release from the Saint Lazare Prison, he rebuilt the property in a Neoclassical style.

References
 Histoire de Paris rue par rue, maison par maison, Charles Lefeuve, 1875

Victoire